"This Time" is a song written by Mark Miller and Mac McAnally and recorded by American country music group Sawyer Brown. It was released in November 1994 as the first single from their compilation album Greatest Hits 1990-1995.  The song reached number 2 on the Billboard Hot Country Singles & Tracks chart, behind Pam Tillis' "Mi Vida Loca (My Crazy Life)".

Content
The narrator discusses constantly being in fights with his significant other but not being able to live without her.

Music video
The music video was directed by Michael Salomon and premiered in early 1995.

Chart performance
"This Time" debuted at number 61 on the U.S. Billboard Hot Country Singles & Tracks for the week of November 19, 1994.

Year-end charts

References

1994 singles
1994 songs
Sawyer Brown songs
Songs written by Mac McAnally
Songs written by Mark Miller (musician)
Music videos directed by Michael Salomon
Curb Records singles